Graphemics or graphematics is the linguistic study of writing systems and their basic components, i.e. graphemes.

At the beginning of the development of this area of linguistics, Ignace Gelb coined the term grammatology for this discipline; later some scholars suggested calling it graphology to match phonology, but that name is traditionally used for a pseudo-science. Others therefore suggested renaming the study of language-dependent pronunciation phonemics or phonematics instead, but this did not gain widespread acceptance either, so the terms graphemics and graphematics became more frequent.

Graphemics examines the specifics of written texts in a certain language and their correspondence to the spoken language. One major task is the descriptive analysis of implicit regularities in written words and texts (graphotactics) to formulate explicit rules (orthography) for the writing system that can be used in prescriptive education or in computer linguistics, e.g. for speech synthesis.

In analogy to phoneme and (allo)phone in phonology, the graphic units of language are graphemes, i.e. language-specific characters, and graphs, i.e. language-specific glyphs. Different schools of thought consider different entities to be graphemes; major points of divergence are the handling of punctuation, diacritic marks, digraphs or other multigraphs and non-alphabetic scripts.

Analogous to phonetics, the "etic" counterpart of graphemics is called graphetics and deals with the material side only (including paleography, typography and graphology).

Graphotactics
Graphotactics refers to rules which restrict the allowable sequences of letters in alphabetic languages. A common example is the partially correct "I before E except after C". However, there are exceptions, for example Edward Carney in his book, A Survey of English Spelling, refers to the "I before E except after C” rule instead as an example of a “phonotactic rule”.
Graphotactical rules are useful in error detection by optical character recognition systems.

In studies of Old English, "graphotactics" is also used to refer to the variable-length spacing between words.

See also 
 Writing systems
 Graphonomics
 Grammatology

References

Grammatology